Due to the plastic-elastic characteristic of a metal, it is typical that any deformation of sheet metal at room temperature will have both elastic and plastic deformation. After the metal workpiece is removed from the tool or deformation implement, the elastic deformation will be released and only the plastic deformation will remain. When a metal forming tool is planned and designed to deform a workpiece, the shape imparted by the tool will be a combination of elastic and plastic deformation. The release of the elastic deformation is the spring back often observed at the end of a metal forming process. 
The spring back has to be compensated to achieve an accurate result.

Usually, that is realized by overbending the material corresponding to the magnitude of the spring back. That means for the practical side of the bending process; the bending former, enters deeper into the bending prism.

For other sheet metal forming operations like drawing, it entails deforming the sheet metal past the planned net shape of the part, so that when the spring back is released from the part, the plastic deformation in that part delivers the desired shape of the part. In the case of complex tools, the spring back has to be already considered in the engineering and construction phases. Therefore, complex software simulations are used. Frequently this is not enough to deliver the desired results. In such cases practical experiments are done, using the trial-and-error plus experience method to correct the tool. However, the results (work pieces) are only stable, if all influencing factors are the same.

This mainly includes:

 Yield strength of the sheet
 Chemical composition of the sheet
 Structure of the material (e.g., direction of grain during production process)
 Wear of tools
 Material temperature
 Aging processes of the raw material (significant for aluminum and copper)
 Deformation rate

The list of factors may be continued. Spring back assessment of final formed products is a difficult problem and is affected by the complexity of the formed shape. The NUMISHEET 93 conference benchmark problem involves the draw bending of a U-channel using three measured parameters. Parameter less approaches have been proposed for more complex geometries but need validation.

Practical example: electronic bending tools with spring-back compensation

Manufactures of electrical assembly's produce components that are flat, using copper and aluminum. The mechanical properties of copper and aluminum are very different and require different programmable inputs in order to achieve the same dimensional characteristics. This variation in inputs is due to spring-back compensation.

Bending technology for flat material which measures each bend angle and provides spring back compensation is required. This gives the bend angle of flat materials true accuracy. This is attained by using bending prisms with electronic angular measurement technology. While bending two flat bolds supporting the material turn around. The bolds are directly connected to the angular sensors. A computer or rather the machine control then calculates the required final stroke. The spring back of every bend is compensated regardless of material type.

If the measuring accuracy is 0.1º, a high angle accuracy of +/- 0.2º is achieved instantly with the first workpiece without any rework. Because no adjustments are required, material waste amounts and setup times drop considerably. Even inconsistencies within a single piece of material are automatically adjusted.

See also
 Bending
 Bending (metalworking)
 Bending machine (manufacturing)
 Numerical control

References

 M. Weck: Werkzeugmaschinen Maschinenarten und Anwendungsbereiche (VDI-BuchSpringer Vieweg Verlag, 6. Aufl. 2005 (2. August 2005), 
 ETH Zürich: Optimierung der Produkt- und Prozessentwicklung. vdf Hochschulvlg, 1999, .
 EHRT: Brochure Bending machines and tools., Rheinbreitbach, 2012.

Metal forming
Fabrication (metal)
Metalworking tools